The Washington DC Sports Hall of Fame is a hall of fame celebrating sportspeople in the Washington, D.C. area. It is located in left field of Nationals Park.

It was established in 1980 as the Washington Hall of Stars at RFK Stadium, but went dormant for about a decade starting around 2001. 

Nominees for inclusion, as determined by a selection committee, “must have gained prominence in the Washington area through their achievements in sports as an athlete, coach, owner, executive, member of the media or contributor.”

Teams of Distinction

References

Halls of fame in Washington, D.C.
Sports in Washington, D.C.